is a private university located in the city of Akita, Japan.

History
The school opened as Akita Keizai University in 1964. It changed its name to Akita Keizaihoka University in 1983. The present name was adopted in 2007.

Organization
Department of Economics
School of Law
Law Department
Police officers, civil servants course
Clerical law course
Enterprise management course
Journalism course
Department of Tourism

Notable alumni
 Yuta Kobayashi - basketball player
 Seiichi Oba – basketball manager
 Keiji Oyama- baseball player
 Toru Shioya – basketball coach

External links
 Official website 

Educational institutions established in 1964
Private universities and colleges in Japan
Universities and colleges in Akita Prefecture
1964 establishments in Japan
Buildings and structures in Akita (city)
Law schools in Japan